Lovellona grandis is a species of sea snail, a marine gastropod mollusk in the family Mitromorphidae.

Description
The shell size varies between 10 mm and 17 mm.

Distribution
This marine species occurs off the Philippines and Japan.

References

 Chino M. & Stahlschmidt P. (2009) New turrid species of the Mitromorpha-complex (Gastropoda: Conidae: Clathurellinae) from the Philippines and Japan. Visaya 2(4): 63–82.

External links
 
 MNHN, Paris: Lovellona grandis (paratype)

grandis
Gastropods described in 2009